Impressive (April 15, 1969 – March 20, 1995) was born an Appendix American Quarter Horse, who earned his full AQHA registration in 1971. He was the 1974 World Champion Open Aged halter stallion, the first such World Champion in his breed, despite carrying only 48 halter points in total. He sired 2,250 foals, of which thirty went on to be World Champions themselves. 

In his showing days, Impressive changed hands a number of times. One of his owners was Dean Landers, who also owned the halter stallions Two Eyed Jack, Coy's Bonanza, and Sonny Dee Bar. Although Impressive was sent to race training, he never raced. He was sent home and the next year he was excluded from any performance discipline due to pedal osteitis, leaving halter as his only choice. His groundbreaking 1974 World Championship soon cemented his role in that discipline. Each time Impressive was resold, his price rose quickly; at one point, an offer of $300,000 for him was refused by Brown, who said "ain't nobody in this world got enough money to buy this horse."

Impressive was highly sought after for breeding, despite at one time carrying a stud fee of $25,000. He sired a total of 2,250 foals, and as of 2003, was estimated to have in excess of 55,000 living descendants. He was bred for his muscular and refined form, which was passed on to his get often enough to make him at least the #5 all-time leading Quarter Horse sire when ranked by AQHA points earned by all progeny combined.

Over time, it became evident that many horses descended from Impressive were afflicted with the genetic disease hyperkalemic periodic paralysis (HYPP). While it is unclear if Impressive himself ever manifested clinical signs of HYPP in his lifetime, he is considered the index case, as the disease has never been observed in horses which are not descendants of his line. HYPP is a dominant gene, and as such, all animals with even one copy of the gene, identified as "N/H", will exhibit some symptoms of the disease. Horses with two copies, identified as "H/H." will always pass on the condition, and research suggests that H/H horses may have more severe symptoms than N/H horses.

After a number of years of debate, effective since January 1, 2007, the AQHA amended rule 205(c)(3) and rule Rule 227(e) to require all descendants of Impressive to be tested prior to being registered, and ban from registration all horses born after January 1, 2007 with HYPP genetics confirmed by DNA testing to be homozygous for the condition (H/H). Other breed registries that accept animals with Quarter Horse bloodlines, including the American Paint Horse Association and the Appaloosa Horse Club, have instituted testing requirements but have yet to bar animals with the condition. There is currently a widespread effort among many breeders to eliminate the disease by selective breeding, but there are those who continue to breed without regard for it, or even deliberately seeking the muscular enhancement correlated with it, and in doing so perpetuate the disease's existence.

Pedigree

External links 
 HYPP: getting to grips with Hyperkalemic Periodic Paralysis - Horsetalk.co.nz
 Bringing Light to HyPP: Impressive
 Impressive data sheet and pedigree
 UC Davis VGL: Hyperkalemic Periodic Paralysis

American Quarter Horse show horses
American Quarter Horse sires
1968 animal births
1995 animal deaths